Marcelo Carracedo (born April 16, 1970 in Buenos Aires, Argentina) is a former Argentine footballer who played during his career in Argentina, Japan, Chile, Mexico, Spain, Germany and Austria.

Club statistics

References

External links

Statistics 
 Marcelo Carracedo at BDFA 

1970 births
Living people
Argentine footballers
Argentine expatriate footballers
Argentina under-20 international footballers
Argentina youth international footballers
Estudiantes de La Plata footballers
Real Murcia players
Fortuna Düsseldorf players
Santos Laguna footballers
Atlético Morelia players
Rosario Central footballers
Club Atlético Platense footballers
Club Deportivo Universidad Católica footballers
Argentine Primera División players
Liga MX players
Bundesliga players
Austrian Football Bundesliga players
Expatriate footballers in Chile
Expatriate footballers in Mexico
Expatriate footballers in Spain
Expatriate footballers in Germany
Expatriate footballers in Austria
Expatriate footballers in Japan
J1 League players
Avispa Fukuoka players
Association football midfielders
Footballers from Buenos Aires
FC Tirol Innsbruck players
Argentine expatriate sportspeople in Austria
Argentine expatriate sportspeople in Japan
Argentine expatriate sportspeople in Germany
Argentine expatriate sportspeople in Spain
Argentine expatriate sportspeople in Chile
Argentine expatriate sportspeople in Mexico